Stefan Wögerbauer (born 3 November 1959) is an Austrian racewalker. He competed in the men's 50 kilometres walk at the 1992 Summer Olympics.

References

1959 births
Living people
Athletes (track and field) at the 1992 Summer Olympics
Austrian male racewalkers
Olympic athletes of Austria
Place of birth missing (living people)